Sergiu Arnăutu (born 27 May 1990) is a Romanian footballer who plays as a striker for CSM Focșani.

Career

Early career
As a youngster he made a name for himself on the fields of FC Petrolul Ploiesti. In 2008,he made his first professional appearance in Liga II.

CFR Cluj's dream
In July 2015, after a good season with CS Juventus Bucuresti in Liga III , where finished 2nd, Sergiu was close to be transferred to CFR Cluj where his ex-coach Eugen Trica was appointed. The transfer was broken down because of financial problems of CFR's.

Honours
Luceafărul Oradea
Liga III: 2015–16

Petrolul Ploiești
Liga III: 2017–18

CS Hunedoara
Liga III: 2021–22

References

External links

1990 births
Living people
People from Vălenii de Munte
Romanian footballers
Association football forwards
Liga I players
FC Petrolul Ploiești players
CS Turnu Severin players
Liga II players
CS Mioveni players
SCM Râmnicu Vâlcea players
ASC Daco-Getica București players
CS Minaur Baia Mare (football) players
CS Luceafărul Oradea players
CS Concordia Chiajna players
Liga III players
CS Corvinul Hunedoara players
CSM Focșani players
Moldovan Super Liga players
FC Tiraspol players
Romanian expatriate footballers
Expatriate footballers in Moldova
Romanian expatriate sportspeople in Moldova